Primera División de México (Mexican First Division) Apertura 2002 is a Mexican football tournament - one of two short tournaments that take up the entire year to determine the champion(s) of Mexican football. It began on Saturday, August 3, 2002, and ran until November 24, when the regular season ended. San Luis, Chiapas and Querétaro were promoted to the Primera División de México thus, Léon and La Piedad were relegated to the Primera División A, allowing 20 teams to compete in the Mexican First Division. On December 21, Toluca defeated Morelia and became champions for the seventh time.

Teams
 The number of participants in the league was expanded to 20 teams.
 La Piedad was moved to Querétaro and was renamed as Gallos Blancos de Querétaro.
 Veracruz was promoted from Primera 'A', however, another team with the same name and venue already existed, so the promoted team was moved to Tuxtla Gutiérrez and was renamed as Jaguares de Chiapas.
 San Luis was promoted from Primera 'A'.
 Atlante F.C. was moved from Mexico City to Ciudad Nezahualcóyotl.

Stadiums and Locations

Personnel and kits

Final standings (groups)

League table

Results

Top goalscorers 
Players sorted first by goals scored, then by last name. Only regular season goals listed.

Source: MedioTiempo

Playoffs

Bracket

Quarterfinals

Toluca won 4–2 on aggregate.

Santos Laguna won 5–4 on aggregate.

UNAM won 3–2 on aggregate.

Morelia won 7–2 on aggregate.

Semifinals

Toluca won 7–4 on aggregate.

Morelia won 5–2 on aggregate.

Finals

Toluca won 4–2 on aggregate.

References

External links
 Mediotiempo.com (where information was obtained)

Mexico
Apertura